40S ribosomal protein S21 is a protein, encoded in humans by the RPS21 gene.

Function 

Ribosomes, the organelles that catalyze protein synthesis, consist of a small 40S subunit and a large 60S subunit. Together these subunits are composed of 4 RNA species and approximately 80 structurally distinct proteins. This gene encodes a ribosomal protein that is a component of the 40S subunit. The protein belongs to the S21E family of ribosomal proteins.

It is located in the cytoplasm. Alternative splice variants that encode different protein isoforms have been described, but their existence has not been verified. As is typical for genes encoding ribosomal proteins, there are multiple processed pseudogenes of this gene dispersed through the genome.

Interactions 

RPS21 has been shown to interact with Ribosomal protein SA.

References

Further reading 

 
 
 
 
 
 
 
 
 
 

Ribosomal proteins